Some Kind of Love is a Canadian documentary film, directed by Thomas Burstyn and released in 2015. The film centres on Yolanda Sonnabend, a British artist whose brother, medical researcher Joseph Sonnabend, has moved back into her dilapidated house in London to help care for her due to her increasing frailty.

Burstyn received a Canadian Screen Award nomination at the 4th Canadian Screen Awards in 2016, for Best Cinematography in a Documentary.

References

External links
 

2015 films
2015 documentary films
Canadian documentary films
2010s English-language films
2010s Canadian films